Sabiha Ziya Bengütaş (1904 – 2 October 1992) was a Turkish sculptor. She is the first woman sculptor of Turkey

Life
Sabiha Ziya was born in İstanbul in 1904. She had a sister and an elder brother. She was schooled at Eyubsultan Numune School, now known as  Eyüp Anatolian High School. She lived four years in Damascus, Syria (then a part of  Ottoman Empire), where her father was assigned to due to his occupation. She continued her education there, attending a French Catholic school for one year. The family returned home and settled in Büyükada, where she completed her secondary education at Köprülü Fuat Pasha School. In 1920, he began studying fine arts in the Painting Department and the Sculpture Department of Istanbul Academy of Fine Arts (current Mimar Sinan University). She was the first female student in the class. Feyhaman Duran was one of her teachers in the academy. In 1924, she  won a state scholarship to study in the Academy of Fine Arts in Rome, Italy, where she was in the workshop of Ermenegildo Luppi  (1877–1937).

Later, she married Şakir Emin Bengütaş, a diplomat and the grandson of poet Abdülhak Hamit Tarhan. She often traveled abroad accompanying her husband. The couple settled at Maltepe neighborhood of Çankaya in Ankara after her spouse retired. She adopted a daughter named Nurol, who became company in her loneliness.

She died in Ankara on 2 October 1992.

Art
In 1925, three busts by Sabiha Ziya were on display in an exposition at Galatasaray, Beyoğlu in Istanbul. The next year, her another three busts were exhibited in the exposition at the same place. Some of her sculptures are the busts of famous people such as poet Ahmet Haşim (1884?–1933), playwright and poet Abdülhak Hamit Tarhan (1852–1937), the first Muslim movie actress Bedia Muvahhit (1897–1994), general and statesman Ali Fuat Cebesoy (1882–1968), First Lady Mevhibe İnönü (1897–1992) and politician Hasan Ali Yücel (1897–1961).

In 1938, she won the first prize in two competitions for sculptures about Mustafa Kemal Atatürk (1881–1938), founder of modern Turkey, and İsmet İnönü (1884–1973), general and statesman. The statue of Atatürk was placed in the garden of former presidential palace of Çankaya Mansion and the statue of İnönü in Mudanya to commemorate the Armistice of Mudanya (1922). She was also the assistant of Pietro Canonica in the creation Monument of the Republic erected in Taksim Square, İstanbul in 1928.

References

1904 births
Artists from Istanbul
Academy of Fine Arts in Istanbul alumni
Turkish women sculptors
20th-century Turkish sculptors
1992 deaths
20th-century women artists